Charpa Falls is a waterfall located in Athirappilly panchayath in Thrissur district of Kerala. Located on the west-flowing Chalakudy River, this waterfall lies in between the more famous Athirappilly Falls and Vazhachal Falls. It is a popular stopover for tourists who are visiting the Athirappilly and Vazhachal Falls. It is located close to the road, and during monsoon months (June to August), the water splashes onto the road. During the dry season, the water stops flowing.

Gallery

See also
 Athirappilly Falls
 Vazhachal Falls
 Chalakudy
 List of waterfalls in India
 List of waterfalls in India by height

References

Waterfalls of Thrissur district